Gethyllis (probably from Greek "gethyon", bulb), commonly called Kukumakranka, Koekemakranka, or Kroekemakrank, is a genus of bulbous plant in the Amaryllid family with some 33 accepted species.. It is native to the Cape Provinces, the Northern Provinces and the Free State of South Africa, as well as Botswana and Namibia.

Description 
The fragrant, solitary, white flower appears late December. Flowering is well-synchronised to increase the odds of cross-pollination, the genus being incapable of self-fertilisation. Triggering of mass flowering is thought to result from a sudden change in barometric pressure. Some three months later the edible, scented creamy-white to orange-yellow to rich burgundy-red, club-shaped fruit starts pushing above the soil surface. The inferior ovary is located well below ground-level where the developing fruit or berry is hidden until its growth forces it into view. Emergence of the fruit is followed almost immediately by the first leaves. The ripe fruit falls over and sheds its short-lived seeds, ready to take advantage of the winter rains. The genus is easily identified by its spirally twisted grey-green, strap-like leaves which develop during the winter months (May - August).

The ripe fruit is sometimes used to impart its special aroma to bottles of brandy.

Taxonomy 
This winter-growing genus is closely related to Apodolirion , which has 6 species found in both summer and winter regions, ranging from the Southern Cape to the summer-rainfall area of the Transvaal. The two genera together constitute the subtribe Gethyllidinae.

Species

Formerly included
A few names have been coined using the name Gethyllis, but referring to species now considered better suited to other genera (Apodolirion Curculigo Empodium). We here provide links to help you locate appropriate information

Distribution and habitat 
Gethyllis has an extensive distribution covering the winter-rainfall area of the southern portion of Namibia and throughout the Cape Provinces, with the Vanrhynsdorp-Nieuwoudtville region showing the greatest species diversity.

Notes

References

Bibliography

External links
Gethyllis links
Gethyllis (SANBI)
Gethyllis images
Gethyllis images
Gethyllis article - Mark Elvin
Indigenous Bulb Association of South Africa

Amaryllidaceae genera
Amaryllidoideae
Flora of Southern Africa